Kevin Andrew Munroe (born 26 October 1972) is a Canadian filmmaker and animator. His best-known work is that of writer and director of TMNT (2007).

Career
Munroe has done extensive animation work during the last decade including video games, TV series, comic books and original. He has worked on the development of writing and design of animated projects for companies like Jim Henson Company, Stan Winston Studios, Shiny Entertainment, Disney, Warner Bros., Cartoon Network and Nickelodeon.

Munroe started his career as storyboard artist on Nickelodeon's Hey Arnold!. He also created, scripted and produced the international Christmas special Donner for ABC Family and TV-Loonland. He also made his directorial debut with the video game Freaky Flyers. He also wrote the critically acclaimed comic book series El Zombo Fantasma which he co-created with Dave Wilkins for Dark Horse Comics, and Olympus Heights for IDW Publishing.

In March 2005, Imagi International signed him on to direct TMNT for a 2007 release date. Kevin Munroe was scheduled to direct Science Ninja Team Gatchaman the movie but pulled out.

Munroe directed and co-produced the 2011 film Dylan Dog: Dead of Night, a live action adaption of the Italian comic Dylan Dog.

In 2016 Munroe co-directed Ratchet & Clank based on the popular video game franchise of the same name.

Works

References

External links

American film directors
American male screenwriters
American film producers
Living people
People from Bathurst, New Brunswick
American storyboard artists
1960 births
Canadian male screenwriters
Film producers from New Brunswick
Film directors from New Brunswick
21st-century Canadian screenwriters
21st-century Canadian male writers